The Waterloo Hawks were a National Basketball League and National Basketball Association team based in Waterloo, Iowa. The Hawks remain the only sports franchise ever based in Iowa from any of the current Big Four Leagues.

Franchise history

The Waterloo Hawks were founded in 1948, playing in the National Basketball League. In 1949, the National Basketball League was absorbed by its rival, the Basketball Association of America, forming the National Basketball Association; the Hawks were thus a founding member of the NBA. In the 1949–1950 season, their first and only one in the NBA, they finished 19–43, fifth out of six in the Western Division. The Waterloo Hawks are of no relation to the current-day Atlanta Hawks franchise; at the time of Waterloo's existence in the NBA, the latter franchise was based in Moline, Illinois as the Tri-Cities Blackhawks (and moved to Milwaukee when Waterloo's franchise folded).

The National Basketball Association contracted after the 1949–1950 season. The league went from 17 teams to 11 before the 1950–1951 season started. Midway through the 1950–1951 season, the Washington Capitols folded as well, bringing the number of teams in the league down to ten.

Meanwhile, the National Professional Basketball League was formed around the former NBA teams, with teams added in new larger markets. The charter teams were the East Division: Sheboygan Redskins (Former NBA), Anderson Packers (Former NBA), Louisville Alumnites and Grand Rapids Hornets. West Division: Denver Refiners/Evansville Agogans, Saint Paul Lights, Kansas City Hi-Spots and Waterloo Hawks (Former NBA).

The arena
The Waterloo Hawks played at the Hippodrome, also known as McElroy Auditorium. The arena is still in use today and is located at 250 Ansborough Ave, Waterloo, IA 50701.

Season-by-season records

Waterloo Hawks all-time coaches
 Charley Shipp (record 8–27)
 Jack Smiley (record 11–16)

Waterloo Hawks all-time roster

B

C

G

H

K

M

O

P

S

T

See also
List of defunct National Basketball Association teams

References

External links
 Waterloo Hawks Complete History
 NBL Logoserver Website
 NBL Standings
 NPBL Standings
Iowa's NBA team from The Des Moines Register
 Promoter put Hawks on an NBA track from The Des Moines Register
 
 

 
Basketball teams established in 1948
Basketball teams disestablished in 1951
Defunct basketball teams in the United States
National Professional Basketball League (1950–51)
1948 establishments in Iowa
1951 disestablishments in Iowa
Defunct National Basketball Association teams
Waterloo, Iowa